San Lorenzo Unified School District is a school district in Alameda County, California, serving the CDP of San Lorenzo and portions of the cities of Hayward and San Leandro and the CDPs of Ashland, Castro Valley and Cherryland. It was established in 1859, making it one of the oldest continuously operating school systems in the State of California. 

Several "small learning communities," each with a distinctive program, have been created at the district's three high school campuses to better serve students. Superintendent Daryl F. Camp, Ed.D. is only the 9th Superintendent in the history of the district. Student population is approx. 9,812.

History
Beginning in 1850 with only six students and a tiny portable schoolhouse that it shared with Hayward, the District reached its peak size in 1970 with 18,000 students enrolled in 28 schools. The members of the first School Board, organized in 1864, were William Meek, John Lewelling, and A. E. Crane.  Meek was the owner of the now historic Meek Mansion in Hayward.

In 1902 the original school building was replaced by a two-story wood structure, which in 1928 was destroyed by an arsonist. Its replacement, a two-story brick building, was quickly built in 1929 but was declared unsafe for students in 1952 because it was not earthquake-proof and had no fire escape. The District administration then occupied the building until the new District Office was built in 1972. As more homes replaced the agricultural land, more schools were built. San Lorenzo High and Arroyo High were part of the Hayward Union High School District until 1963, when San Lorenzo became a Unified School District. (Marina High School was built in 1964, closed in 1983).

Board of Education
 The Board of Education consists of 6 members in total. 5 are elected to 4 year terms at-large and are the voting members of the Board, and 1 (the Student Board Trustee) is appointed by the sitting Board of Education and is entitled to an emblematic vote.

Schools
  There are 18 total schools in San Lorenzo Unified School District, of which there are 5 high schools, 4 middle schools, and 9 elementary schools totaling to a student population of 9,812.

Small Learning Communities (SLCs)
Circa 2004, SLZUSD made a request-for-proposals to create small, thematic academies as "schools-within-schools."  These Small Learning Communities (SLC) are designed to house no more than 400 students each.  The program has doubled from four initial academies to a full menu of Small Learning Communities:
Bay Area Digital Arts (SLz campus)
East Bay Arts  (EBArts campus)
Futures Academy  (AYO campus)
Green Engineering & Technology  (SLz campus)
Health and Medicine Academy  (AYO campus)
Law, Leadership & Culture  (SLz campus)
Tech-Links Academy  (AYO campus)
TREND Academy  (AYO campus)

References

External links
"Proud Boys hurl slurs at a Drag Queen story hour for kids, police say" TODAY
"Arroyo High School principal wrongly accuses student of bullying a peer at anti-bullying assembly" Mercury News
"Complaints against San Lorenzo principal pile up" East Bay Times
San Lorenzo Unified School District website
 "Bay Area isn’t above the Confederacy fray: High school scrubs Rebel mascot" San Francisco Chronicle

School districts in Alameda County, California
1859 establishments in California